Limbatochlamys parvisis is a moth of the family Geometridae first described by Hong-Xiang Han and  Da-Yong Xue in 2005. It is found in Yunnan, China.

The length of the forewings is 25 mm for males and 29 mm for females.

References

Moths described in 2005
Pseudoterpnini